Glenea hasselti is a species of beetle in the family Cerambycidae. It was described by Ritsema in 1892. It is known from Sumatra.

References

hasselti
Beetles described in 1892